, real name , is a Japanese comedian famous for his stand-up act.

Originally a member (a quick-tempered tsukkomi) of a kombi called Babies (ベイビーズ), he started working as a host in Tokyo under the host name Ken Saegami (冴神剣 Saegami Ken) when Babies dissolved. Making a mere amount of yen equivalent to $800 per month, he worked as a host for nearly 3 years.

After quitting his host job, he returned to the comedy circuit with a new name, "Hiroshi"—taken from the announcer Hiroshi Ikushima (生島ヒロシ Ikushima Hiroshi)—and a new gimmick; one that would eventually gain him stardom in 2004 while landing stand-up spots on various comedy programs including the popular The god of Entertainment. (エンタの神様). His skit always follows the same formula: A simple introduction followed by a recollection of past and present pitiful episodes in his life after which he repeats, "I am Hiroshi." (ヒロシです/Hiroshi desu), while Italian singer Peppino Gagliardi's "Che vuole questa musica stasera" plays in the background.

He is always seen wearing typical host-style apparel, and he is known as a depressed character, which is reflected in his skits, and in the way he is treated by other owarai talents.

References

External links
Sun Music Profile 

1972 births
People from Ōmuta, Fukuoka
Living people
Japanese comedians